Siyin is a village in Kale Township, Kale District, in the Sagaing Region of western Burma. It lies at the mouth of the Siyin Valley where it debouches into the Kale Valley.

Notes

  

Populated places in Kale District
Kale Township